Concept2, Inc. is an American manufacturer of rowing equipment and exercise machines that is based in Morrisville, Vermont. It is best known for its air resistance indoor rowing machines (known as "ergometers" or "ergs"), which are considered the standard training and testing machines for competition rowers and can be found in most gyms. 

Competitive events rowed on Concept2 rowing machines include the CRASH-B Sprints (which style themselves "the world championship for indoor rowing"), the British Rowing Indoor Championships competitions and the CrossFit Games events (including the CrossFit Open and qualifiers). Concept2 also manufactures oars for sculling and sweep rowing (under the name Dreissigacker), as well as air resistance Nordic skiing trainers (SkiErgs).

History 
The company was founded in 1976 by rowing brothers Dick and Pete Dreissigacker. The two brothers trialed for the American team for the 1976 Summer Olympics and while preparing, they modified their oars with carbon fiber in an attempt to go faster. When they were not selected for the team, they founded the company and started selling carbon fiber oars. Their first office was in the back of a bread truck until they bought a farm in Morrisville, Vermont, United States.

Oars 
Dreissigacker oars were well received by the rowing community and quickly established themselves as one of the major players in the market. In 1991, the company came out with asymmetrical "hatchet" oar blades. These improved a team's performance by 1 or 2% and became popular so quickly that by 1992 most of the Olympic crews were using them.  Many elite rowers use Concept2 oars, and along with Croker oars they make up the majority of oars used in international competition.

Indoor rower (erg) 

In 1981, the brothers had the idea of making an indoor rowing machine (the Model A) made mainly from bicycle parts. It had a moving seat and a flywheel which used air for resistance. At the time the indoor machines on the market cost $3,000, but the brothers (with help from friend Jon Williams) sold theirs for $600. The product was an instant success and has been revised over the years with the Model B (1986), Model C (1993), Model D (2003), Model E (2006) and Dynamic (2010).

Until 2006 the company produced and sold only one model of indoor rower at any time. That changed in September 2006, when Concept2 upgraded their Model D and began selling a new prosumer-oriented Model E (priced around $400/£300 above Model D) that provides a higher rowing position with extra layers of paint/varnish, shipped with a more advanced ("PM4") monitor and bundled an ANT+HR-compatible Garmin heart rate belt. Both D & E models are used for indoor rowing events such as BIRC and CRASH-B.  In 2018, CrossFit officially made Concept2's D & E models as the official spec rowers for The CrossFit Open and Games following an investigation discovered rival manufacturer Xebex was "significantly easier than the competition standard," resulting in an official declaration that the Concept2 was the specification manufacturer.

In 2010, they introduced the Dynamic indoor rower, which has a moving foot stretcher instead of a moving seat. This results in less body mass movement compared to the prior indoor rower models and simulates on water rowing more closely.

The most current electronic monitor for feedback on the indoor rowers as of September 2014 is the Performance Monitor 5 or "PM5".

In early 2021, it was announced that the Model D and Model E would be discontinued and replaced by the "RowErg" and "Elevated RowErg" respectively. The "RowErg" will be identical to the black Model D, with only the name and graphics changing. The "Elevated RowErg" will be exactly the same as the "RowErg", but will have taller front and rear legs, meaning the seat will be 20" from the ground, rather than  14". The renaming of the Model D is partly to achieve consistency across the range, with the SkiErg and BikeErg. 

The friction-prone areas like chain are coated with nickel for the longevity of the parts. Nickel coating also assists in lubrication and maintenance.

The indoor rower's nickname comes from its measurement of the power output of oarsmen/women.  As such it is a class of ergometer (Greek: measuring work), and competitive rowers rarely refer to the machine as an "indoor rower," but use the older name "erg" or "ergo" (short for ergometer).

SkiErg 

In June 2009, Concept2 introduced the SkiErg. The SkiErg is a ski ergometer that helps build strength and endurance specific to Nordic skiing.  The SkiErg uses the same mechanical concept that the company's indoor rowers do, but the user is in a standing position pulling on two handles emulating the double-pole technique found in Nordic skiing. Each pull engages the arms, shoulders, core, and legs in a downwards "crunch" making it a total body workout. It places greater physical demands on the triceps, chest, and abdominal muscles, in addition to the strong engagement of the back muscles that both exercises share.

DYNO
The Concept2 DYNO was an air resistance strength training machine sold by Concept2 from 2001 until 2007. It was designed for bench press, leg press, and seated row exercises and used a flywheel to provide resistance.

BikeErg 
The Concept2 BikeErg is a stationary bike that was introduced in 2017. It uses a flywheel similar to the one found on Concept2's indoor rower and SkiErg.

Online logbook and world rankings
Starting 1999, the company began facilitating a community of home-based rowers who maintain online logs hosted on the Concept2 website.  Their performances are ranked in real time on the Concept2 website. The total number of meters logged in the 2014 season (May 1, 2013 – April 30, 2014) exceeded 10.2 billion, by over 47,000 users. There are hundreds of clubs that rowers may affiliate with when registering with the ranking system. Meters can be logged on the indoor rower, on water, on the SkiErg or on snow. Concept2 also hosts year-round online challenges aimed at motivating rowers.

Online challenges
Concept2 organizes a number of challenges throughout the year. Many of these reward consistency and total meters instead of speed, giving an extra incentive to work out regularly.

Virtual Team Challenge
The Virtual Team Challenge (VTC), runs every year from January 1–31. Each team completes as many meters as they can collectively between 12:00 a.m. January 1 and 11:59 p.m. January 31. Virtual teams (not based on or around a specific physical location) can be made up of anyone from anywhere who wants to participate—friends, family, co-workers, old schoolmates, rowing teammates, and so on. Teams can also be real "clubs" with a physical location. Participants are only allowed to record meters from the Indoor Rower the SkiErg. Greenwich Crew from Cos Cob, CT currently holds the title of the Virtual Team Challenge, winning for three consecutive years in 2018, 2019, and 2020.

See also 

 Rogue Fitness
 StairMaster
 Vacuactivus
 MoonRun

References

External links

Concept2 official website
Concept2 official UK website

Manufacturing companies based in Vermont
Rowing equipment manufacturers
Sporting goods manufacturers of the United States
1976 establishments in Vermont
American companies established in 1976
Exercise_equipment_companies
Morristown, Vermont